Poecilotettix pantherinus, the panther-spotted grasshopper, is a species of spur-throated grasshopper in the family Acrididae. It is found in Mexico and the southwestern United States.

References

External links

 

Melanoplinae